Devin Cuddy (born 1987) is a Canadian singer-songwriter who fronts the Devin Cuddy Band.

Personal life

His father, Jim Cuddy, is a founding member of the well-known Canadian band Blue Rodeo.  His mother, Rena Polley, is an actress. He has a younger sister Emma (b. 1988) and brother Sam (b. 1992).

Devin Cuddy Band

The Devin Cuddy Band consists of Devin Cuddy, Michael Tuyp, Zach Sutton, and Devon Richardson.  Their first album "Volume One" was released on Cameron House Records in 2012 and has been nominated for roots & traditional album of the year (group) at the 2014 Juno Awards.

In early 2014, his band opened for Blue Rodeo on that band's "In Our Nature" tour.

References

Canadian rock singers
Canadian country singer-songwriters
Canadian male singer-songwriters
Canadian rock guitarists
Canadian country guitarists
Canadian male guitarists
Living people
1987 births
Musicians from Toronto
Canadian country rock musicians
21st-century Canadian guitarists
21st-century Canadian male singers